The Jasper County Courthouse, built in 1915, is an historic courthouse located in the city of Ridgeland in  Jasper County, South Carolina. It was designed in the Colonial Revival style by Darlington native William Augustus Edwards who designed eight other South Carolina courthouses as well as academic buildings at 12 institutions in Florida, Georgia and South Carolina. Jasper County was created in 1912 and this is the only courthouse it has ever had, On October 30, 1981, it was added to the National Register of Historic Places.

See also
List of Registered Historic Places in South Carolina
 Jasper County Courthouse (disambiguation), for other places with the same name

References

External links 
 South Carolina Association of Counties page for Jasper County
 National Register listings for Jasper County
 University of Florida biography of William Augustus Edwards
 

County courthouses in South Carolina
William Augustus Edwards buildings
Buildings and structures in Jasper County, South Carolina
Courthouses on the National Register of Historic Places in South Carolina
National Register of Historic Places in Jasper County, South Carolina